The River Dikler is a short river in the Cotswold District of Gloucestershire which flows for  through Upper Swell and to the west of Stow on the Wold. It flows into the River Windrush, a tributary of the River Thames, just to the east of Bourton-on-the-Water.

See also
List of rivers of England

References

External links

Rivers of Gloucestershire
2Dikler